John Mason was a Scottish-American soccer defender who played three seasons in the North American Soccer League and earned one cap with the U.S. national team.

Mason was the first American Youth Soccer Organization (A.Y.S.O.) graduate to turn professional in early 1975.  He played for the Los Angeles Aztecs of the North American Soccer League from 1975 to 1977.  He earned his cap in a 1-1 World Cup qualification tie with Canada on September 24, 1977.

See also
List of United States men's international soccer players born outside the United States

References

American Youth Soccer Organization players
United States men's international soccer players
North American Soccer League (1968–1984) players
North American Soccer League (1968–1984) indoor players
Los Angeles Aztecs players
Scottish emigrants to the United States
Living people
1953 births
American soccer players
Association football midfielders